The 1920 International Lawn Tennis Challenge, more commonly known as the Davis Cup, was the 15th edition of the major international team event in men's tennis. Six nations competed for the right to challenge holders Australasia. The Netherlands joined the competition for the first time.

The initial draw consisted of four countries and drew the United States against France and the Netherlands against Great Britain. The applications of Canada and South Africa were received after the deadline but their entries were accepted by the other countries and subsequently a new draw was made.

"Big Bill" Tilden and "Little Bill" Johnston made their debut for the United States, and would not lose a rubber the entire tournament. In the Challenge Round, they reclaimed the cup from Australasia. The final, in honor of Anthony Wilding,  was played at the Domain Cricket Club in Auckland, New Zealand on 30 December - 1 January 1921.

Draw
Netherlands competed for the first time.

Quarterfinals
Netherlands vs. South Africa

France vs. United States

Semifinal
Great Britain vs. United States

Challenge Round
Australasia vs. United States

References

External links
Davis Cup official website

Davis Cups by year
International Lawn Tennis Challenge
International Lawn Tennis Challenge
1920s in Auckland
Tennis in New Zealand
Tennis tournaments in New Zealand
1920 in Dutch sport
1920 in English tennis
Tennis tournaments in England
Tennis tournaments in the Netherlands